Nawaf Falah (born 20 June 1986 in Az Zubayr, Basra, Iraq) is an Iraqi football player who currently plays for Naft Al-Janoob in Iraq.

External links
Profile on Goalzz.com

1986 births
Living people
Iraqi footballers
People from Basra
Iraqi expatriate footballers
Sportspeople from Basra
Al-Mina'a SC players
Al-Zawraa SC players
Al-Shorta SC players
Al Wahda FC players
Al-Bahri players
UAE Pro League players
Association football forwards
Association football midfielders
Iraq international footballers